Zəyəm Cırdaxan (also Dzegam-Dzhirdakhan, Dzegam-Dzhyrdakhan, and Zeyamdzhirdakhan) is a village and the most populous municipality, except for the capital Şəmkir, in the Shamkir Rayon of Azerbaijan. It has a population of 7,546.

References 

Populated places in Shamkir District